The Park of Eternal Glory is a park in Kyiv, Ukraine.

Areas 
 Alley of Heroes
 Memorial of Eternal Glory 
 Tomb of the Unknown Soldier
 National Museum "Memorial to Holodomor victims"

History 
In 1894, the commandant of the Kyiv fortress, Lieutenant General Alexei Anosov began work on streamlining and improvement of this site. In 1957, the Memorial of Eternal Glory was opened inside the park. In honor of the 30th anniversary of the Victory over Nazi Germany in 1945, the Alley of hero cities, which leads from Lavra street to the Tomb of the Unknown Soldier, was formed. In 1984, on the occasion of the 40th anniversary of the liberation of Ukraine from the Nazi invaders, the park was reconstructed. The National Museum "Memorial to Holodomor victims" welcomed its first visitors on 22 November 2008.

Gallery

References 

Parks in Kyiv
Monuments and memorials in Kyiv